The women's 400 metres hurdles competition at the 2006 Asian Games in Doha, Qatar was held on 10 December 2006 at the Khalifa International Stadium.

Schedule
All times are Arabia Standard Time (UTC+03:00)

Records

Results

References

External links 
Results – Final

Athletics at the 2006 Asian Games
2006